Ordesa Cascada is a famous waterfall and cave area located in the Ordesa Valley in Spain.

Caves of Spain
Waterfalls of Spain
Landforms of Aragon